The 1903–04 Army Cadets men's basketball team represented United States Military Academy during the 1903–04 college men's basketball season. The head coach was Joseph Stilwell, coaching his second season with the Black Cadets. The team captain was Horatio Hackett.

Schedule

|-

References

Army Black Knights men's basketball seasons
Army
Army Cadets Men's Basketball Team
Army Cadets Men's Basketball Team